Vladislav "Slava" Mendelevich Tsukerman (born March 9, 1940) is a Russian film director of Jewish origin.  He was born in the Soviet Union and emigrated in 1973 with his wife Nina Kerova to Israel.  In 1976 he moved to New York City.  He is best known for producing, directing, and writing the screenplay for the 1982 cult film Liquid Sky. He also directed the 2004 documentary Stalin's Wife (about Nadezhda Alliluyeva) and the 2008 film Perestroika. Today, he resides in New York City with his wife and producing partner Nina Kerova.

In 2014, Tsukerman confirmed in an interview with The Awl that a sequel to Liquid Sky titled Liquid Sky 2 was in the works.  Lead actress Anne Carlisle would be returning in the sequel in the role of Margaret.

In the 1960s he studied at the Moscow Institute of Civil Engineering (MISI), where he began creating. Tsukerman made his first film at 21 years of age, titled I Believe in Spring. It was the first independent short fiction film in Soviet history. It won first prize at the All-Union Festival of Amateur Films in Moscow. It went on to win a prize at the Montreal World Film Festival. In the 1970s he immigrated to Israel and worked for Israeli television. There, he filmed a documentary titled Once Upon a Time There Were Russians in Jerusalem. The film won Best Documentary and Best Director at The World Television Film Festival in Hollywood.

Awards
1961 - First Prize - Moscow All-Union Festival of Amateur Films - I Believe Spring
Gold Medal of VDNH (Highest Award of Soviet Industry)
1970 - Lomonosov Prize of the 1st degree (Highest award of the USSR Academy of Sciences)
1982 - Special Prize of the Jury - Montréal Film Festival - Liquid Sky 
1983 - Audience Award - Sydney International Film Festival - Liquid Sky.
1983 - Special Jury Prize - Cartagena Film Festival - Liquid Sky 
1983 - Special Prize of the Jury - Brussels International Film Festival - Liquid Sky  
2001 - Best Directing - Kinotavr Film Festival - Poor Liza
2001 - Grand Prix Prize - Gatchina Film Festival - Poor Liza

References

External links

 Official "Slava Tsukerman" site
 "Slava Tsukerman" FaceBook page
Official "Liquid Sky" site
Official "Stalin's Wife" site

1940 births
Living people
Russian film directors
American film directors
Israeli emigrants to the United States
Soviet emigrants to Israel
Russian Jews